Chryseobacterium arachidis  is a Gram-negative and rod-shaped bacteria from the genus of Chryseobacterium which has been isolated from a rhizosphere environment.

References

Further reading

External links
Type strain of Chryseobacterium arachidis at BacDive -  the Bacterial Diversity Metadatabase

arachidis
Bacteria described in 2014